Theodore G. Venetoulis (June 14, 1934 – October 6, 2021) was an American politician from Maryland and a member of the Democratic Party. He served as the sixth Baltimore County Executive from 1974 to 1978. He ran for Governor of Maryland in 1978 but lost the Democratic primary election to Harry R. Hughes.

Career

Venetoulis had a number of jobs in his lifetime. While going through graduate school, he served as the Administrative Assistant to Congressman Jim Wright and Congressman Carlton Sickles. He did Advance work for President John Kennedy and President Lyndon Johnson. He managed William Donald Schaefer’s first campaign for Mayor; he was the Maryland coordinator for the presidential campaign of Robert Kennedy and the Maryland chairman for Senator and Secretary of State, Edmund Muskie. In 1974 he was elected to the office of Baltimore County Executive leading the movement that reformed the County’s political and governmental systems. After an unsuccessful bid for Maryland Governor, he purchased a bankrupt newspaper, initiated and acquired others that were later acquired by the Baltimore Sun paper. The Washington Post acquired an additional group of newspapers he published. During that time span, he served as a television commentator and political analyst and anchored the award winning news magazine, Edition Eleven. He lectured and taught courses in politics and the media at Johns Hopkins University, Towson University and Goucher College. He wrote articles for the New York Times, the Washington Post and the Baltimore Sun. He authored three books—“The House Shall Choose”— a history of the presidential elections determined by The House of Representatives; "Against the Urban Wall" — a compendium of articles on the urban condition; and a satirical political novel – “Hail to the Cheat”. He was a founding member, director and Chairman of the Executive Committee of the Columbia Bank. He served as a Commissioner on the Maryland Port Authority; a Trustee of Goucher College; a Director of the Canton Railroad Company; and a Trustee of the Maryland Public Broadcasting Corporation. He held a Master’s Degree from Johns Hopkins University in Government and International Relations and a Masters Degree from American University in Public Administration. He was married and has three children.

References

Maryland Democrats
1934 births
2021 deaths
Baltimore County Executives
American people of Greek descent